Anchieta's serotine (Neoromicia anchieta), formerly known as Anchieta's pipistrelle, is a species of vesper bat. It is found in Angola, Democratic Republic of the Congo, South Africa, Zambia, Zimbabwe and Madagascar. The species inhabits savanna habitats.

Taxonomy and etymology
It was described as a new species in 1900 by Antero Frederico de Seabra. Seabra gave it the binomial of Vesperugo anchieta. The specific epithet anchieta was emended to anchietae, which is the current specific epithet. Seabra made an  error in his original spelling and corrected it in a later publication in 1900.
The holotype had been collected in Cahata, Angola. The eponym for the species name "anchietae" is José Alberto de Oliveira Anchieta, a Portuguese zoologist.

It was formerly classified in the genus Pipistrellus, but phylogenetic evidence supports it belonging in the genus Neoromicia.

Description

Range and habitat
It is found in several countries in Africa, including Angola, Democratic Republic of the Congo, South Africa, Zambia, and Zimbabwe. It has also been documented in Madagascar, though observations are rare. It is found in association with riparian habitats, as well as coastal and scrub forests. It has been documented in the Bushveld ecoregion, often near open water.

References

Neoromicia
Taxonomy articles created by Polbot
Bats of Africa
Mammals described in 1900
Taxobox binomials not recognized by IUCN